Captain Laxmi Indira Panda was an Indian revolutionary and one of the youngest members of Netaji Subash Chandra Bose's Indian National Army. Panda was the only Odia
woman to serve in the INA.

Panda had joined Indian National Army (INA) in the Rani of Jhansi Regiment, when she was only 14 years old and fought against the British rule in India.

The Government of Odisha announced to install a statue at Jeypore in memory of Panda after her death in October 2008.

On October 25, 2008, she was conferred the Rashtriya Swantantra Sainik Samman,  the highest title conferred on a freedom fighter in India.

Death 
Panda died on October 7, 2008, at the AIIMS Delhi after a prolonged illness. She was cremated with full state honours and a guard of honour was also given on behalf the Orissa Police.

References

External links 
 Laxmi Indira Panda

1930 births
2008 deaths
Indian revolutionaries
Azad Hind
Indian National Army personnel
People from Odisha
Indian independence movement
Indian independence activists from Odisha
Indian rebels
Indian women in war
Subhas Chandra Bose
People from Bhubaneswar